Frank Steunenberg (August 8, 1861December 30, 1905) was the fourth governor of the State of Idaho, serving from 1897 until 1901. He was assassinated in 1905 by one-time union member Harry Orchard, who was also a paid informant for the Cripple Creek Mine Owners' Association. Orchard attempted to implicate leaders of the radical Western Federation of Miners in the assassination. The labor leaders were found not guilty in two trials, but Orchard spent the rest of his life in prison.

Early career
Born in Keokuk, Iowa, and raised in Knoxville, Steunenberg was the fourth of ten children of Bernardus and Cornelia (Keppel) Steunenberg, with five brothers and four sisters. He attended Iowa State College at Ames and then went on to become a printer's apprentice and publisher. In 1881 he was hired by the Des Moines Register in Des Moines. Steunenberg later published a newspaper in Knoxville until 1886, when he moved west and settled in Caldwell, Idaho Territory, where he joined his younger brother Albert K. Steunenberg (1863–1907) in taking over the Caldwell Tribune for six years.

Steunenberg became active in politics as a member of the 1889 Idaho Constitutional Convention which led to Idaho's admission to the Union in 1890. In 1890, he was elected to the Idaho House of Representatives as a fusion candidate, endorsed by both the Democratic and Populist Parties, and he served one term.  In addition, he served for several years as chairman of the Caldwell town council.

Governor

With labor union support, in 1896 Steunenberg was nominated as both the Democratic and Populist candidate for governor. He won the November election at age 35 and became the first non-Republican elected to that office and was re-elected to a second two-year term in 1898. (Four-year terms began with 1946 election.) Steunenberg served during a period of considerable labor unrest, particularly in the mining industry in northern Idaho. As a result, many corporations, fearing that Steunenberg's government would not support them if there was a strike, increased their wages for workers.

The Bunker Hill Mining Company, however, hired only non-union labor, and kept wages lower than unionized mines in the area. In April 1899, members of the Western Federation of Miners destroyed the company's mill at Wardner in the Silver Valley. In response, Steunenberg declared martial law and because the national guard was deployed to the Philippines due to the Spanish–American War of the preceding year, Steunenberg asked President William McKinley to send federal troops to quell the unrest. This action was seen as a betrayal by Steunenberg's union supporters. Martial law remained in place through the end of his term, and Steunenberg did not seek a third term in 1900.

Assassination

Nearly five years after he left office, Steunenberg was killed outside his house in Caldwell at 1602 Dearborn Street by a bomb rigged to the side  Harry Orchard, a former miner from the Western Federation of Miners (WFM), was arrested in Caldwell shortly after for the assassination, and the investigation was conducted by Pinkerton agent James McParland. Orchard at first claimed innocence, but after solitary confinement and intense interrogation by McParland,  Orchard signed a 64-page type-written confession detailing years of being a paid assassin and dynamiter for the WFM.  Orchard claimed he was hired to kill Steunenberg by leadership of the WFM, and he had been in previous jobs that resulted in at least 17 other deaths.  Orchard said his orders for the killing of Steunenberg came from "Big Bill" Haywood, general secretary of the WFM, Charles Moyer, president of the WFM, and George Pettibone, a labor activist who had a prior conviction related to an 1892 labor dispute in Coeur d'Alene. At McParland's urging, the three were arrested in Denver in February 1908, and hurriedly extradited to Idaho for trial.

The nationally publicized trial took place in Boise over several months in mid-1907 and included new U.S. Senator William Borah for the prosecution and Clarence Darrow for the defense. On the witness stand, Orchard repeated his written confession, admitting to years of setting bombs for the WFM. He was then cross-examined by defense lawyers for 26 hours, spread out over a week's time. In addition to Orchard, the prosecution presented 80 more witnesses to corroborate Orchard's description of numerous attacks.  Darrow and the defense team called over 100 witnesses of their own. Closing arguments lasted two weeks, the most talked about of which was by Darrow. Modern commentators have praised Darrow's closing argument, which used powerful emotional rhetoric focused on the moral superiority of the unions' position. However contemporary reaction was universally negative.  The Chicago Tribune called it "the most unseemly, abusive, inflammatory speech ever delivered in an American courtroom."  Despite most observers' opinions that the verdict would be guilty, the jury returned an acquittal for Haywood in late July. Pettibone was defended in a separate trial by Judge Orrin N. Hilton of Denver, Colorado and was also acquitted, and charges were dropped against Moyer.

Orchard pled guilty and received a death sentence in a separate trial, but the sentence was commuted to life in prison. In 1952, at 86 years of age and 45 years after the Haywood trial, Orchard wrote in his autobiography that all of his confession and his trial testimony were true.

Legacy

At the request of the Steunenberg family, attorney Borah gave a brief oration at the funeral in Caldwell on January 2, 1906.

A monument to Steunenberg was dedicated in December 1927 in Boise; the outdoor bronze statue faces the front steps of the Idaho State Capitol from across Jefferson Street. Its inscription is as follows:

Frank Steunenberg
Governor of Idaho
1897 – 1900

When in 1899 organized lawlessness challenged the power of Idaho, he upheld the dignity of the state, enforced its authority and restored LAW AND ORDER within its boundaries, for which he was assassinated in 1905."Rugged in body, resolute in mind, massive in the strength of his convictions, he was of the granite hewn." In grateful memory of his courageous devotion to public duty, the people of Idaho have erected this monument.

The quote is from Borah's oration at the funeral in 1906.

See also

 Harry Orchard, convicted assassin
 James McParland, Pinkerton Detective responsible for investigation
 Steve Adams, accused accomplice
 Bill Haywood, union leader accused, and acquitted, of conspiracy
 Frank R. Gooding, Idaho Governor during assassination and trials
 Coeur d'Alene, Idaho labor confrontation of 1899, alleged reason for the assassination
 List of assassinated American politicians

References

Further reading
 The Trial of Bill Haywood - a detailed account of the murder trial
  An extensive discussion of the class warfare occurring at the turn of the 20th century.

External links

Steunenberg descendant's blog with historical analysis, speculation, and related family information
Smithsonian Institution Art Inventories Catalog – Frank Steunenberg, Governor of Idaho 1897-1900, (sculpture)
Photo of Steunenberg statue

Murder of Frank Steunenberg
Biography
Frank Steunenberg at National Governors Association

|-

1861 births
1905 deaths
1905 murders in the United States
19th-century American newspaper publishers (people)
19th-century American politicians
20th-century American politicians
Assassinated American politicians
Deaths by improvised explosive device in the United States
Democratic Party governors of Idaho
Idaho Populists
Iowa State University alumni
Democratic Party members of the Idaho House of Representatives
People from Caldwell, Idaho
People from Keokuk, Iowa
People from Knoxville, Iowa
People murdered in Idaho
People's Party state governors of the United States